André Reinholdsson (born 25 April 1996) is a Swedish footballer who plays as a forward.

External links
 (archive)

André Reinholdsson at Fotbolltransfers

1996 births
Living people
Association football midfielders
Mjällby AIF players
Trelleborgs FF players
Oskarshamns AIK players
IK Brage players
Norrby IF players
Allsvenskan players
Superettan players
Swedish footballers